Nathaniel Adams Coles (March 17, 1919 – February 15, 1965), known professionally as Nat King Cole, was an American singer, jazz pianist, and actor. Cole's career as a jazz and pop vocalist started in the late 1930s and spanned almost three decades where he found success and recorded over 100 songs that became hits on the pop charts. He received numerous accolades including a star on the Hollywood Walk of Fame (1960) and a Special Achievement Golden Globe Award. Posthumously, Cole has received the Grammy Lifetime Achievement Award (1990), along with the Sammy Cahn Lifetime Achievement Award (1992) and has been inducted into the Rock and Roll Hall of Fame (2000), and the National Rhythm & Blues Hall of Fame (2020). 

Cole started his career as a jazz pianist in the late 1930s, where he formed The King Cole Trio which became the top-selling group (and the only black act) on Capitol Records in the 1940s. His trio was the model for small jazz ensembles that followed. Starting in 1950 he transitioned to become a solo singer billed as Nat King Cole. Despite achieving mainstream success, during his career he faced intense racial discrimination. While not a major vocal public figure in the civil rights movement, Cole was a member of his local NAACP branch and participated in the 1963 March on Washington. He regularly performed for civil rights organizations. From 1956 to 1957, he hosted the NBC variety series The Nat King Cole Show, which became the first nationally broadcast television show hosted by an African American.

Some of his most notable singles include "Unforgettable", "Smile", "L-O-V-E", "Let There Be Love", "Mona Lisa", "Autumn Leaves", "Stardust", "Straighten Up and Fly Right", "The Very Thought of You", "For Sentimental Reasons", "Embraceable You" and "Almost Like Being in Love". He is known for his Christmas album The Magic of Christmas (1960) which included "The Christmas Song"; in 1999 it was named by Rolling Stone as one of the greatest Christmas albums of all time. He was the father of singer Natalie Cole (1950–2015), who covered her father's songs in the 1991 album Unforgettable... with Love.

Biography

Early life
Nathaniel Adams Coles was born in Montgomery, Alabama, on March 17, 1919. He had three brothers: Eddie (1910–1970), Ike (1927–2001), and Freddy (1931–2020), and a half-sister, Joyce Coles. Each of the Coles brothers pursued careers in music. When Cole was four years old, the family moved to Chicago, Illinois, where his father, Edward Coles, became a Baptist minister.

Cole learned to play the organ from his mother, Perlina Coles, the church organist. His first performance was "Yes! We Have No Bananas" at the age of four. He began formal piano lessons at 12, learning jazz, gospel, and classical music "from Johann Sebastian Bach to Sergei Rachmaninoff". As a youth, he joined the news delivery boys' "Bud Billiken Club" band for The Chicago Defender.

The Cole family moved to the Bronzeville neighborhood of Chicago, where he attended Wendell Phillips Academy High School, the school Sam Cooke attended a few years later. He participated in Walter Dyett's music program at DuSable High School. He would sneak out of the house to visit clubs, sitting outside to hear Louis Armstrong, Earl Hines, and Jimmie Noone.

Early career

When he was 15, Cole dropped out of high school to pursue a music career. After his brother Eddie, a bassist, came home from touring with Noble Sissle, they formed a sextet and recorded two singles for Decca in 1936 as Eddie Cole's Swingsters. They performed in a revival of the musical Shuffle Along. Nat Cole went on tour with the musical. In 1937, he married Nadine Robinson, who was a member of the cast. After the show ended in Los Angeles, Cole and Nadine settled there while he looked for work. He led a big band and found work playing piano in nightclubs. When a club owner asked him to form a band, he hired bassist Wesley Prince and guitarist Oscar Moore. They called themselves the King Cole Swingsters after the nursery rhyme in which "Old King Cole was a merry old soul". They changed their name to the King Cole Trio before making radio transcriptions and recording for small labels.

Cole recorded "Sweet Lorraine" in 1940, and it became his first hit. According to legend, his career as a vocalist started when a drunken bar patron demanded that he sing the song. Cole said that this fabricated story sounded good, so he did not argue with it. There was a customer one night who demanded that he sing, but because it was a song Cole did not know, he sang "Sweet Lorraine" instead. As people heard Cole's vocal talent, they requested more vocal songs, and he obliged.

1940s
In 1941, the trio recorded "That Ain't Right" for Decca, followed the next year by "All for You" for Excelsior. They recorded "I'm Lost", a song written by Otis René, the owner of Excelsior.

Cole appeared in the first Jazz at the Philharmonic concerts in 1944. He was credited on Mercury as "Shorty Nadine", a derivative of his wife's name, because he had an exclusive contract with Capitol since signing with the label the year before. He recorded with Illinois Jacquet and Lester Young.

In 1946, the trio broadcast King Cole Trio Time, a 15-minute radio program. This was the first radio program to be hosted by a black musician. Between 1946 and 1948, the trio recorded radio transcriptions for Capitol Records Transcription Service. They performed on the radio programs Swing Soiree, Old Gold, The Chesterfield Supper Club, Kraft Music Hall, and The Orson Welles Almanac.

Cole began recording and performing pop-oriented material in which he was often accompanied by a string orchestra. His stature as a popular star was cemented by hits such as "All for You" (1943), "The Christmas Song" (1947), "(Get Your Kicks on) Route 66", "(I Love You) For Sentimental Reasons" (1946), "There! I've Said It Again" (1947), "Nature Boy" (1948), "Frosty The Snowman", "Mona Lisa" (No. 1 song of 1950), "Orange Colored Sky" (1950), "Too Young" (the No. 1 song of 1951).

1950s 
On June 7, 1953, Cole performed for the ninth Cavalcade of Jazz concert held at Wrigley Field in Chicago which was produced by Leon Hefflin, Sr. Featured that day were Roy Brown and his Orchestra, Shorty Rogers, Earl Bostic, Don Tosti and His Mexican Jazzmen, and Louis Armstrong and his All Stars with Velma Middleton.

On November 5, 1956, The Nat 'King' Cole Show debuted on NBC. The variety program was one of the first hosted by an African American. The program started at a length of fifteen-minutes but was increased to a half-hour in July 1957. Rheingold Beer was a regional sponsor, but a national sponsor was never found. The show was in trouble financially despite efforts by NBC, Harry Belafonte, Tony Bennett, Ella Fitzgerald, Eartha Kitt, Frankie Laine, Peggy Lee, and Mel Tormé. Cole decided to end the program. The last episode aired on December 17, 1957. Commenting on the lack of sponsorship, Cole said shortly after its demise: "Madison Avenue is afraid of the dark."

Throughout the 1950s, Cole continued to record hits that sold millions throughout the world, such as "Smile", "Pretend", "A Blossom Fell", and "If I May". His pop hits were collaborations with Nelson Riddle, Gordon Jenkins, and Ralph Carmichael. Riddle arranged several of Cole's 1950s albums, including Nat King Cole Sings for Two in Love (1953), his first 10-inch LP. In 1955, "Darling, Je Vous Aime Beaucoup" reached number 7 on the Billboard chart. Love Is the Thing went to number one in April 1957 and remained his only number one album.

In 1959, he received a Grammy Award for Best Performance By a "Top 40" Artist for "Midnight Flyer".

In 1958, Cole went to Havana, Cuba, to record Cole Español, an album sung entirely in Spanish. It was so popular in Latin America and the U.S. that it was followed by two more Spanish-language albums: A Mis Amigos (1959) and More Cole Español (1962).

After the change in musical tastes, Cole's ballads appealed little to young listeners, despite a successful attempt at rock and roll with "Send for Me", which peaked at number 6 on the pop chart. Like Dean Martin, Frank Sinatra, and Tony Bennett, he found that the pop chart had been taken over by youth-oriented acts.

1960s 
In 1960, Cole's longtime collaborator Nelson Riddle left Capitol to join Reprise Records, which was established by Frank Sinatra. Riddle and Cole recorded one final hit album, Wild Is Love, with lyrics by Ray Rasch and Dotty Wayne. Cole later retooled the concept album into an Off-Broadway show, I'm with You.

Nevertheless, Cole recorded several hit singles during the 1960s, including "Let There Be Love" with George Shearing in 1961, the country-flavored hit "Ramblin' Rose" in August 1962 (reaching No.  2 on the Pop chart), "Dear Lonely Hearts" (No. 13), "That Sunday, That Summer" (No. 12) and "Those Lazy-Hazy-Crazy Days of Summer" (his final top-ten hit, reaching number 6 on the Pop chart). He performed in many short films, sitcoms, and television shows and played W. C. Handy in the film St. Louis Blues (1958). He appeared in The Nat King Cole Story, China Gate, and The Blue Gardenia (1953).

In January 1964, Cole made one of his final television appearances, on The Jack Benny Program. He was introduced as "the best friend a song ever had" and sang "When I Fall in Love". Cat Ballou (1965), his final film, was released several months after his death.

Earlier on, Cole's shift to traditional pop led some jazz critics and fans to accuse him of selling out, but he never abandoned his jazz roots; as late as 1956 he recorded an all-jazz album, After Midnight, and many of his albums after this are fundamentally jazz-based, being scored for big band without strings, although the arrangements focus primarily on the vocal rather than instrumental leads.

Cole had one of his last major hits in 1963, two years before his death, with "Those Lazy-Hazy-Crazy Days of Summer", which reached number 6 on the Pop chart. "Unforgettable" was made famous again in 1991 by Cole's daughter Natalie when modern recording technology was used to reunite father and daughter in a duet. The duet version rose to the top of the pop charts, almost forty years after its original popularity.

Cole's final studio album was titled L-O-V-E. The album peaked at No. 4 on the Billboard Albums chart in the spring of 1965.

Personal life
Around the time Cole launched his singing career, he entered into Freemasonry. He was raised in January 1944 in the Thomas Waller Lodge No. 49 in California. The lodge was named after fellow Prince Hall mason and jazz musician Fats Waller. He joined the Scottish Rite Freemasonry, becoming Master Mason. Cole was "an avid baseball fan", particularly of Hank Aaron. In 1968, Nelson Riddle related an incident from some years earlier and told of music studio engineers, searching for a source of noise, finding Cole listening to a game on a transistor radio.

Marriages and children

Cole met his first wife, Nadine Robinson, while they were on tour for the all-black Broadway musical Shuffle Along. He was 18 when they married. She was the reason he moved to Los Angeles and formed the Nat King Cole trio. This marriage ended in divorce in 1948. On March 28, 1948 (Easter Sunday), six days after his divorce became final, Cole married the singer Maria Hawkins. The Coles were married in Harlem's Abyssinian Baptist Church by Adam Clayton Powell Jr. They had five children: Natalie (1950–2015), who had a successful career as a singer before dying of congestive heart failure at age 65; an adopted daughter, Carole (1944–2009, the daughter of Maria's sister), who died of lung cancer at the age of 64; an adopted son, Nat Kelly Cole (1959–1995), who died of AIDS at the age of 36; and twin daughters, Casey and Timolin (born September 26, 1961), whose birth was announced in the "Milestones" column of Time magazine on October 6, 1961. Maria supported him during his final illness and stayed with him until his death. In an interview, she emphasized his musical legacy and the class he exhibited despite his imperfections.

Experiences with racism
In August 1948, Cole purchased a house from Col. Harry Gantz, the former husband of the silent film actress Lois Weber, in the all-white Hancock Park neighborhood of Los Angeles. The Ku Klux Klan, which was active in Los Angeles in the 1950s, responded by placing a burning cross on his front lawn. Members of the property-owners association told Cole they did not want any "undesirables" moving into the neighborhood. Cole responded, "Neither do I. And if I see anybody undesirable coming in here, I'll be the first to complain." His dog died after eating poisoned meat, something likely to be connected to his moving to the neighborhood.

In 1956, Cole was contracted to perform in Cuba. He wanted to stay at the Hotel Nacional de Cuba in Havana but was refused because it operated a color bar. Cole honored his contract, and the concert at the Tropicana Club was a huge success. During the following year, he returned to Cuba for another concert, singing many songs in Spanish.

In 1956, Cole was assaulted on stage during a concert in Birmingham, Alabama, with the Ted Heath Band while singing the song "Little Girl". Having circulated photographs of Cole with white female fans bearing incendiary boldface captions reading "Cole and His White Women" and "Cole and Your Daughter" three men belonging to the North Alabama Citizens Council assaulted Cole, apparently attempting to kidnap him.

The three assailants ran down the aisles of the auditorium towards Cole. Local law enforcement quickly ended the invasion of the stage, but in the ensuing mêlée Cole was toppled from his piano bench and received a slight injury to his back. He did not finish the concert. A fourth member of the group was later arrested. All were tried and convicted. 

Six men, including 23-year-old Willie Richard Vinson, were formally charged with assault with intent to murder him, but later the charge against four of them was changed to conspiracy to commit a misdemeanor. The original plan to attack Cole included 150 men from Birmingham and nearby towns.

After being attacked in Birmingham, Cole said, "I can't understand it ... I have not taken part in any protests. Nor have I joined an organization fighting segregation. Why should they attack me?" Cole said he wanted to forget the incident and continued to play for segregated audiences in the American South. He said he could not change the situation in a day. He contributed money to the Montgomery bus boycott and had sued northern hotels that had hired him but refused to serve him. 

Thurgood Marshall, the chief legal counsel of the NAACP, called him an Uncle Tom and said he should perform with a banjo. Roy Wilkins, executive secretary of the NAACP, wrote him a telegram that said:

The Chicago Defender said Cole's performances for all-white audiences were an insult to his race. The New York Amsterdam News said that "thousands of Harlem blacks who have worshiped at the shrine of singer Nat King Cole turned their backs on him this week as the noted crooner turned his back on the NAACP and said that he will continue to play to Jim Crow audiences". To play "Uncle Nat's" discs, wrote a commentator in The American Negro, "would be supporting his 'traitor' ideas and narrow way of thinking". 

Deeply hurt by the criticism in the black press, Cole was chastened. Emphasizing his opposition to racial segregation "in any form", he agreed to join other entertainers in boycotting segregated venues. He paid $500 to become a lifetime member of the Detroit branch of the NAACP. Until his death in 1965, Cole was an active and visible participant in the civil rights movement, playing an important role in planning the March on Washington in 1963.

Politics
Cole performed in 1956 for President Dwight D. Eisenhower's televised birthday celebration. At the 1956 Republican National Convention, he sang "That's All There Is to That" and was "greeted with applause". 

He was also present at the Democratic National Convention in 1960 to support Senator John F. Kennedy. He was among the dozens of entertainers recruited by Frank Sinatra to perform at the Kennedy Inaugural gala in 1961. Cole consulted with Kennedy and his successor, Lyndon B. Johnson, on civil rights.

Illness and death
In September 1964, Cole began to lose weight and experienced back problems. He collapsed with pain after performing at the Sands Hotel in Las Vegas. In December, he was working in San Francisco when he was finally persuaded by friends to seek medical help. A malignant tumor in an advanced state of growth on his left lung was observed on a chest X-ray. Cole, who was a heavy cigarette smoker, had lung cancer and was expected to have only months to live. Against his doctors' wishes, Cole carried on his work and made his final recordings between December 1 and 3 in San Francisco, with an orchestra conducted by Ralph Carmichael. The music was released on the album L-O-V-E shortly before his death. His daughter noted later that he did this to assure the welfare of his family.

Cole entered Saint John's Health Center in Santa Monica on December 7, and cobalt therapy was started on December 10. Frank Sinatra performed in Cole's place at the grand opening of the new Dorothy Chandler Pavilion of the Los Angeles Music Center on December 12. Cole's condition gradually worsened, but he was released from the hospital over the New Year's period. At home Cole was able to see the hundreds of thousands of cards and letters that had been sent after news of his illness was made public. Cole returned to the hospital in early January. He also sent $5,000 (US$ in  dollars) to actress and singer Gunilla Hutton, with whom he had been romantically involved since early 1964. Hutton later telephoned Maria and implored her to divorce him. Maria confronted her husband, and Cole finally broke off the relationship with Hutton. Cole's illness reconciled him with his wife, and he vowed that if he recovered he would go on television to urge people to stop smoking. On January 25, Cole's entire left lung was surgically removed. His father died of heart problems on February 1. Throughout Cole's illness his publicists promoted the idea that he would soon be well and working, despite the private knowledge of his terminal condition. Billboard magazine reported that "Nat King Cole has successfully come through a serious operation and... the future looks bright for 'the master' to resume his career again". On Valentine's Day, Cole and his wife briefly left St. John's to drive by the sea. He died at the hospital early in the morning of Monday, February 15, 1965.

Cole's funeral was held on February 18 at St. James' Episcopal Church on Wilshire Boulevard in Los Angeles; 400 people were present, and thousands gathered outside the church. Hundreds of members of the public had filed past the coffin the day before. Honorary pallbearers included Robert F. Kennedy, Count Basie, Frank Sinatra, Sammy Davis Jr., Johnny Mathis, George Burns, Danny Thomas, Jimmy Durante, Alan Livingston, Frankie Laine, Steve Allen, and Pat Brown (the governor of California). The eulogy was delivered by Jack Benny, who said that "Nat Cole was a man who gave so much and still had so much to give. He gave it in song, in friendship to his fellow man, devotion to his family. He was a star, a tremendous success as an entertainer, an institution. But he was an even greater success as a man, as a husband, as a father, as a friend." Cole's remains were interred in Freedom Mausoleum at Forest Lawn Memorial Park, in Glendale, California.

Posthumous releases
Cole's last album, L-O-V-E, was recorded in early December 1964—just a few days before he entered the hospital for cancer treatment—and was released just before he died. It peaked at number 4 on the Billboard Albums chart in the spring of 1965. A Best Of album was certified a gold record in 1968. His 1957 recording of "When I Fall in Love" reached number 4 in the UK charts in 1987, released in reaction to a version by Rick Astley challenging for the coveted Christmas number 1 spot.

In 1983, an archivist for EMI Electrola Records, a subsidiary of EMI Records (Capitol's parent company) in Germany, discovered some unreleased recordings by Cole, including one in Japanese and another in Spanish ("Tu Eres Tan Amable"). Capitol released them later that year as the LP Unreleased.

In 1991, Mosaic Records released The Complete Capitol Records Recordings of the Nat King Cole Trio, a compilation of 349 songs available as an 18-CD or a 27-LP set. In 2008, it was re-released in digital-download format through services like iTunes and Amazon Music.

Also in 1991, Natalie Cole recorded a new vocal track that was mixed with her father's 1961 stereo re-recording of his 1951 hit "Unforgettable" for a tribute album of the same title. The song and album won seven Grammy awards in 1992 for Best Album and Best Song.

Discography 

 The King Cole Trio (1944)
 The King Cole Trio, Volume 2 (1946)
 The King Cole Trio, Volume 3 (1947)
 The King Cole Trio, Volume 4 (1949)
 Nat King Cole at the Piano (1950)
 Harvest of Hits (1950)
 King Cole for Kids (1951)
 Penthouse Serenade (1952)
 Top Pops (1952)
 Two In Love (1953)
 Unforgettable (1954)
 Penthouse Serenade (1955)
 Nat King Cole Sings for Two in Love (1955)
 The Piano Style of Nat King Cole (1955)
 After Midnight (1957)
 Just One of Those Things (1957)
 Love Is the Thing (1957)
 Cole Español (1958)
 St. Louis Blues (1958)
 The Very Thought of You (1958)
 To Whom It May Concern (1958)
 Welcome to the Club (1958)
 A Mis Amigos (1959)
 Tell Me All About Yourself (1960)
 Every Time I Feel the Spirit (1960)
 Wild Is Love (1960)
 The Magic of Christmas (1960)
 The Nat King Cole Story (1961)
 The Touch of Your Lips (1961)
 Nat King Cole Sings/George Shearing Plays (1962)
 Ramblin' Rose (1962)
 Dear Lonely Hearts (1962)
 More Cole Español (1962)
 Those Lazy-Hazy-Crazy Days of Summer (1963)
 Where Did Everyone Go? (1963)
 Nat King Cole Sings My Fair Lady (1964)
 Let's Face the Music! (1964, recorded 1961)
 I Don't Want to Be Hurt Anymore (1964)
 L-O-V-E (1965)
 Nat King Cole Sings His Songs From 'Cat Ballou' and Other Motion Pictures (1965)
 Live at the Sands (1966, recorded 1960)

His hit singles include "Straighten Up and Fly Right" 1944 No. 8, "The Christmas Song" 1946/1962/2018 No. ?/No. 65/No. 11, "Nature Boy" 1948 No. 1, "Mona Lisa 1950 No. 1, "Frosty, The Snowman" 1950 No. 9, "Too Young" 1951 No. 1, "Unforgettable" 1951 No. 12, "Somewhere Along the Way" 1952 No. 8, "Answer Me, My Love" 1954 No. 6, "A Blossom Fell" 1955 No. 2, "If I May" 1955 No. 8, "Send for Me" 1957 No. 6, "Looking Back" 1958 No. 5, "Ramblin' Rose" 1962 No. 2, "Those Lazy, Hazy, Crazy Days of Summer" 1963 No. 6, and "Unforgettable" 1991 (with daughter Natalie).

Filmography

Film

Television

Awards and honors

Cole was inducted into the Alabama Music Hall of Fame and the Alabama Jazz Hall of Fame. He was awarded the Grammy Lifetime Achievement Award in 1990. In 1992, he received the Sammy Cahn Lifetime Achievement Award from the Songwriters Hall of Fame. He was also inducted into the DownBeat Jazz Hall of Fame in 1997 and the Hit Parade Hall of Fame in 2007. A United States postage stamp with Cole's likeness was issued in 1994. Cole was inducted into the Rock and Roll Hall of Fame in 2000, and the Latin Songwriters Hall of Fame in 2013.

Cole's success at Capitol Records, for which he recorded more than 150 singles that reached the Billboard Pop, R&B, and Country charts, has yet to be matched by any Capitol artist. His records sold 50 million copies during his career. His recording of "The Christmas Song" still receives airplay every holiday season, even hitting the Billboard Top 40 in December 2017. In 2020, Cole was inducted into the National Rhythm & Blues Hall of Fame.

See also

 List of African-American firsts
 List of Freemasons
 The Ethel Waters Show

References

Further reading
 Will Friedwald, Straighten Up and Fly Right: The Life and Music of Nat King Cole, Oxford University Press, 2020. .
 
 Bill Dobbins and Richard Wang. "Cole, Nat 'King'." Grove Music Online. Oxford Music Online. Oxford University Press. Web. September 28, 2016.
 Pelote, Vincent. "Book Reviews: "Unforgettable: The Life and Mystique of Nat King Cole," by Leslie Gourse." Notes: Quarterly Journal of the Music Library Association, vol. 49, no. 3, 1993., pp. 1073–1074,

External links

 
 
 
 Nat King Cole at NPR.org
 Nat "King" Cole article in the Encyclopedia of Alabama
 

 
1919 births
1965 deaths
20th-century American guitarists
20th-century American male actors
20th-century American singers
African-American Episcopalians
African-American guitarists
African-American jazz pianists
African-American male actors
African-American male singers
African-American television hosts
African-American television personalities
American baritones
American crooners
American Freemasons
American gospel singers
American jazz pianists
American jazz singers
American male film actors
American male guitarists
American male jazz musicians
American male organists
American male pianists
American male pop singers
American male singers
American male television actors
American performers of Latin music
American pop pianists
Big band pianists
Big band singers
Burials at Forest Lawn Memorial Park (Glendale)
Capitol Records artists
Deaths from lung cancer in California
Decca Records artists
Easy listening musicians
Grammy Lifetime Achievement Award winners
Guitarists from Alabama
Guitarists from Chicago
Guitarists from Los Angeles
Japanese-language singers
Jazz musicians from Alabama
Jazz musicians from California
Jazz musicians from Chicago
King Cole Trio members
Male actors from Chicago
Male actors from Los Angeles
Male actors from Montgomery, Alabama
Musicians from Montgomery, Alabama
People from North Chicago, Illinois
Racially motivated violence against African Americans
Singers from Alabama
Singers from Chicago
Singers from Los Angeles
Spanish-language singers of the United States
Swing pianists
Swing singers
Television personalities from Chicago
Traditional pop music singers